Aulitiving Island is an uninhabited island located in the Qikiqtaaluk Region of Nunavut, Canada. It is located in Baffin Bay's Isabella Bay by the Davis Strait. It is situated north of Baffin Island's Henry Kater Peninsula.

Geography

References

External links 
 Aulitiving Island in the Atlas of Canada - Toporama; Natural Resources Canada

Islands of Baffin Island
Islands of Baffin Bay
Uninhabited islands of Qikiqtaaluk Region